Len Renery is a retired English-American professional soccer defender and coach.

Renery moved to the United States when he was 13 years old, lived in Neptune Township, New Jersey and graduated from Neptune High School in 1966, where he was a varsity baseball and soccer player. In 2010, Neptune High School inducted Renery into its Athletics Hall of Fame. 

After a prep year at Suffield Academy in Connecticut, Renery entered Columbia University where he played on the men's soccer team from 1968 to 1971.  He was a 1969 and 1970 first-team All Ivy.   He graduated in 1971 and was inducted into the Columbia University Athletics Hall of Fame in 2015.

In 1972, he played for the expansion New Jersey Brewers of the American Soccer League.  He signed with the New York Cosmos of the North American Soccer League in 1973. Renery finished his career in the Major Indoor Soccer League with the San Francisco Fog in 1981.

Photos, newspaper clippings and team jerseys from his years with the ASL, NASL and MISL can be found at NASLJerseys.com.

Renery coached Sacred Heart Preparatory in Atherton, California from 1985 to 1995.  In May 1996, he became head coach of the Menlo College men's team.  He spent ten years at Menlo.

References

External links
NASL/MISL stats

1949 births
Living people
American Soccer League (1933–1983) players
Association football defenders
Cleveland Cobras players
Columbia Lions men's soccer players
Baltimore Comets players
California Surf players
Footballers from Greater London
Major Indoor Soccer League (1978–1992) players
New Jersey Brewers players
New York Apollo players
New York Cosmos players
North American Soccer League (1968–1984) players
San Diego Jaws players
San Francisco Fog (MISL) players
Soccer players from New Jersey
English emigrants to the United States
People from Neptune Township, New Jersey
Neptune High School alumni
Sportspeople from Monmouth County, New Jersey
American soccer players